The 51st Directors Guild of America Awards, honoring the outstanding directorial achievements in films, documentary and television in 1998, were presented on March 6, 1999 at the Hyatt Regency Century Plaza. The nominees in the feature film category were announced on January 25, 1999 and the other nominations were announced starting on February 1, 1999.

Winners and nominees

Film

Television

Commercials

Lifetime Achievement in News Direction
 Richard B. Armstrong

Frank Capra Achievement Award
 Tom Joyner

Robert B. Aldrich Service Award
 Arthur Hiller

Franklin J. Schaffner Achievement Award
 Robert Caminiti

Diversity Award
 Steven Bochco

References

External links
 

Directors Guild of America Awards
1998 film awards
1998 television awards
1998 in American cinema
1998 in American television
1998 awards in the United States
1999 in Los Angeles
March 1999 events in the United States